Hosams Abu Meri (Houssam Abou Merhi; born 20 August 1974 in Lebanon) is a Latvian politician. He became faction head of the Unity party on December 21, 2017.

References

1974 births
Living people
New Unity politicians
Deputies of the 12th Saeima
Deputies of the 14th Saeima